"Palaeornis" cliftii is a pterosaur species known from parts of a single humerus (upper arm bone) found in the early Cretaceous (Valanginian) of the upper Tunbridge Wells Sand Formation, England.

Discovery and naming
"Palaeornis" cliftii was one of the earliest pterosaur discoveries in England and has a long and complicated nomenclatural history. It was originally identified as a prehistoric bird by Gideon Mantell (1837, 1844), but was recognized as a pterosaur by Giebel (1847) and Owen (1846, 1859), who named it Pterodactylus ornis and P. silvestris respectively. Lydekker (1888) and Hooley (1914) tentatively referred it to Ornithocheirus, although the holotype NHM UK 2353/2353a does not overlap with the holotype of the Ornithocheirus type species. Wellnhofer (1978) referred Palaeornis clifti to Ornithocheiridae incertae sedis. 

Witton et al. (2009) re-examined the type specimen and realized that "P." clifti is not an ornithocheirid, referring it to Lonchodectidae based on similarities to humeri assigned to Lonchodectes by Hooley (1914). Averianov (2012, 2014) referred the taxon to Azhdarchoidea indeterminate in his re-assessment of Ornithostoma.

The name Palaeornis had previously been used for a genus of parakeet (now considered a synonym of Psittacula) by Vigors in 1825. Mantell was apparently aware of this, and in some later publications used the name "Palaeornithis" (Mantell, 1848) as a replacement.

References

Early Cretaceous pterosaurs of Europe
Azhdarchoids
Taxa named by Gideon Mantell